Thomas Ridley (1799 – March 20, 1879) was a merchant and political figure in Newfoundland. He represented Conception Bay in the Newfoundland and Labrador House of Assembly from 1842 to 1848.

He was born in England or Ireland and came to Newfoundland around 1820 to work for his uncle William Bennett, later becoming his partner in the firm Bennett and Ridley. With a partner, he established Thomas Ridley and Company, a fishing supply business, in Harbour Grace; the firm was later renamed Ridley and Sons. He was a member of the Executive Council from 1843 to 1848. The business was declared insolvent in 1873. Ridley returned to England and died in Upper Tooting, Surrey in 1879.

References 

Members of the Newfoundland and Labrador House of Assembly
1799 births
1879 deaths
British emigrants to pre-Confederation Newfoundland
Members of the Executive Council of Newfoundland and Labrador
Newfoundland Colony people